Sir John (Jack) Harold Plumb  (20 August 1911 – 21 October 2001) was a British historian, known for his books on British 18th-century history.

Biography
Plumb was born in Leicester on 20 August 1911. He was educated at Alderman Newton's School, Leicester, then at University College, Leicester (BA Lond. 1933) and finally at Christ's College, Cambridge (PhD 1936). His doctoral thesis, on the social structure of the House of Commons at the time of William III, was supervised by G. M. Trevelyan, the only time that Trevelyan is believed to have taken on that role. In 1939, Plumb was elected to the Ehrman Fellowship, which was a research fellowship at King's College, Cambridge.

During the Second World War, Plumb worked in the codebreaking department of the Foreign Office at Bletchley Park, Hut 8 and Hut 4, later Block B. He headed a section working on a German Navy hand cipher, Reservehandverfahren.

In 1946, he became a Fellow and Tutor of Christ's College and a University Lecturer in History. In 1957, he was awarded the degree of Doctor of Letters for his work on 18th-century history, and in 1962, he was appointed Reader in Modern History at Cambridge University. He became Professor of Modern English History in the University in 1966. He served as Master of Christ's College from 1978 to 1982.

He had a visiting professorship at Columbia University in 1960. He was elected a Fellow of the British Academy in 1968 and knighted in 1982.

Plumb was the European Advisory Editor for Horizon, and the advisory editor for history for Penguin Books. In the 1960s he branched out as an editor, notably working on The History of Human Society series. Contributors to his books included other well-known historians like Morris Bishop, Jacob Bronowski, and Maria Bellonci. Later Plumb worked with Hugh Casson on the BBC television series Royal Heritage about the British Royal family and the Royal Collections first broadcast in 1977.

An obituary in the New York Times observed that from the 23 books that he wrote between 1950 and 1973, Plumb became wealthy enough to "indulge his taste for fine food and wine;" to build a collection of rare porcelain; to drive a Rolls-Royce; and to live in a "16th-century rectory in Suffolk, a mill in the south of France and a Manhattan pied-à-terre in the Carlyle Hotel."

Influence
Plumb is seen as mentor to a school of historians, having in common a wish to write accessible, broad-based work for the public: a generation of scholars that includes Roy Porter, Simon Schama, Linda Colley, David Cannadine and others who came to prominence in the 1990s. He was champion of a 'social history' in a wide sense; he backed this up with a connoisseur's knowledge of some fields of the fine arts, such as Flemish painting and porcelain. This approach rubbed off on those he influenced, while he clashed unrepentantly with other historians (notably Cambridge colleague Geoffrey Elton) with a perspective from constitutional history whose emphasis was on more traditional scholarship.

Friends from his early life, C. P. Snow and William Cooper, portrayed him in novels; he also is known to be the model for a character in an Angus Wilson short story The Wrong Set.

Works

England in the Eighteenth Century (1950), Pelican Books, London, 
Chatham (1953)
Studies in Social History (1955)
The First Four Georges (1956)
Sir Robert Walpole (1956, 1960) in two volumes, sub-titled The Making of a Statesman and The King's Minister
The Italian Renaissance (1961, 1987, 2001), American Heritage, New York, 
Men And Places (1963)
Crisis in the Humanities (Ed., 1964) Penguin, Harmondsworth & Baltimore (responses to Snow's Two Cultures)
The Growth of Political Stability in England 1675–1725 (1967)
The Death of the Past (1969)
In The Light of History (1972)
The Commercialization of Leisure (1974)
Royal Heritage: The Treasure of the British Crown (1977)
New Light on the Tyrant George III: The Second George Rogers Clark Lecture (1978)
The Making of a Historian (1988) essays
The American Experience (1989) essays.

References

 Black, Jeremy, "Plumb, J.H." in 

 
 Neil McKendrick's obituary in the Guardian: 
Simon Schama's obituary in the Independent: 

1911 births
2001 deaths
Alumni of the University of Leicester
Alumni of Christ's College, Cambridge
Fellows of the British Academy
Knights Bachelor
Masters of Christ's College, Cambridge
Members of the University of Cambridge faculty of history
Bletchley Park people
People educated at Alderman Newton's School, Leicester
People from Leicester
20th-century British historians